David Jones Pty Limited, trading as David Jones (colloquially DJs), is an Australian luxury department store, owned since 2014 by South African retail group Woolworths Holdings Limited. In December 2022, David Jones was sold to private equity firm Anchorage Capital Partners for around $100m.

David Jones was founded in 1838 by David Jones, a Welsh merchant and future politician, after he emigrated to Australia, and is the oldest continuously-operating department store in the world still trading under its original name.

In 1980, the Adelaide Steamship Company acquired a substantial interest in David Jones, culminating in a complete takeover. The recession of the early 1990s caused the department store assets to be floated as "David Jones Limited". For the next two decades, the company went through turbulent times, eventually leading to discussions of a merger with Myer, and then, in 2014, a takeover by South African retail group Woolworths Holdings Limited. In 2016, Woolworths sold the iconic 1938 Market Street store and announced the relocation of DJ's head office to Richmond, Victoria.

It has been a member of the International Association of Department Stores from 1979 to 2004.

David Jones Limited currently has 45 stores located in most Australian states and territories (except Tasmania and the Northern Territory). David Jones' main competitor is the larger, upmarket department store chain Myer. On 28 July 2016, David Jones opened its first New Zealand store in Wellington after buying Kirkcaldie & Stains, and on 21 November 2019, opened its first Auckland store in the newly-developed Westfield Newmarket.

History

David Jones, a Welsh merchant, met a Hobart businessman, Charles Appleton, in London. Appleton had established a store in Sydney in 1825 and Jones subsequently established a partnership with him, moved to Australia in 1835, and the Sydney store became known as Appleton and Jones. When the partnership was dissolved in 1838, Jones moved his business to premises on the corner of George Street and Barrack Lane. Jones survived the depression of the 1840s, and by 1856 had retired from active management of the business. A few years later when the firm failed, he returned to manage its affairs and within a few years had fully discharged all obligations to his creditors.

By 1887, the George Street store had been rebuilt and a mail-order facility was introduced. A factory was opened in Marlborough Street, Sydney, to reduce reliance on imported goods. On the death of the founder, his son, Edward Lloyd Jones (1844–1894), led the company. At 18, Edward Lloyd Jones, Jr. (1874–1934) journeyed to England and entered the London office of David Jones. On his return to Australia, he gained pastoral and cattle experience in the Burnett district of Queensland. He re-entered the family business upon the death of his father in the train disaster at Redfern in 1894. David Jones was then a private company, but in 1906, it became a public company. Edward Lloyd Jones, Jr. became chairman of directors and held that position until he resigned in 1921. The Elizabeth Street store was opened in 1927 under the guidance of chairman Charles Lloyd Jones. A further store was opened in Market Street, Sydney, in 1938. A small branch was located in the Australia Hotel on Martin Place. In 1954, a state banquet was held for visiting Queen Elizabeth II in the restaurant of the Elizabeth Street store.

1940s - 1980s

Regional NSW and interstate entry
Within New South Wales, David Jones established its first store in Newcastle by acquiring Scott's on Hunter Street in 1957 (closed 2011), and in Wollongong, the retailer Walter Lance and Co. in 1960. David Jones acquired and then converted the Big W Department Stores at Kotara Fair and the two-storey Big W at Warrawong in 1971. The Warrawong store closed in February 1986. A store in Wagga Wagga was added due to the purchase of David Copland and Co in 1953 (closed 1971).

David Jones' expanded into Victoria in the 1960s and in 1982 acquired the three stores of Buckley & Nunn located in Bourke Street, Northland, and Chadstone (closed the latter in 1983). In 1987, David Jones purchased the former GJ Coles store and building at 299 Bourke Street, Melbourne, converting it into a David Jones store. David Jones also owned the former Georges store in Collins Street, Melbourne between 1981 and 1995. In South Australia there were the acquisitions of Charles Birks & Co (Adelaide) in 1954 and John Martin's (Adelaide) in 1985. In Western Australia, it acquired Bon Marche (Perth) in 1954 (closed 1979), Foy & Gibson in 1964 (closed 1978), and Aherns (Perth) in 1999. In Queensland, David Jones purchased Finney Isles (Brisbane) in 1955, McKimmons (Townsville) in 1960 (relocated from Flinders Street and then closed in 1994), T.C. Beirne (Brisbane) in 1961, Marsh and Webster (Mackay) in 1963 (closed 1981), Boland's (Cairns) also in 1963 (relocated to Earlville in 1984, since closed), Wyper Bros. (Bundaberg) in 1972 (closed 1981), and Stuparts (Maryborough) in 1977 (closed 1981).

United States
In 1974, David Jones acquired a group of 12 stores in the United States, called Buffum's. These were ultimately rolled into Adelaide Steamship Company and closed by that company in May 1991.

David Jones Art Gallery
A significant feature of the Elizabeth Street shop, contributing greatly to its aura of quality and exclusivity, was the David Jones Art Gallery founded in 1944. Directors included Will Ashton (1944–47), Marion Hall Best (1947–49), John Amory (1949–50), M P Ferrandiere (1950–53), George Duncan (1953–63), Robert Haines (1963–76), Brian Moore (1976–84), and Peta Phillips (1984–92). Among the many drawcards were the Dobell exhibition of 1944, the Duke of Bedford's collection in 1962, and the Mendel Collection of Modern Painting, also in 1962. Prominent arts societies that held annual exhibitions there included the Australian Art Society, the Society of Artists, Australian Watercolour Institute, Contemporary Art Society, and Society of Sculptors and Associates. Prize exhibitions held in the Gallery included those sponsored by WD & HO Wills and Transfield.

Dajonians Repertory Society
Throughout the 1930s and '40s, the Sydney store supported the Dajonians Repertory Society, a Staff Club amateur theatre group. Their plays were variously performed in the David Jones theatrette and such theatres as St James' Hall and Independent Theatre. They engaged the services of a permanent producer (Carl Francis throughout the '30s and Frederick Hughes from 1940) and produced six plays a year, mostly light comedies by recognised playwrights such as J. B. Priestley. Through this time the company was led by Sir Charles Lloyd Jones until his death in 1958. By 1959, the store network had expanded to eight stores, with expansion focused upon the burgeoning new suburbs of Sydney.

1980s - 2000s
In 1980, the Adelaide Steamship Company, headed by John Spalvins, acquired a substantial interest in David Jones, culminating in a complete takeover that took the company out of the Jones' family hands for the first time in its history. Through the 1980s and into the 1990s, the two companies involved themselves in a complex company structure whereby they each owned about half of each other, and financed by huge borrowings, acquired a portfolio of other companies. Other acquisitions made by Adelaide Steamship included Petersville Sleigh, Tooth & Co, Penfolds, and numerous others.

The recession of the early 1990s caused the nervous lenders (over 200 banks) to demand the return of their assets. This forced the liquidation of the portfolio at "fire-sale" prices and led the two companies into bankruptcy; the worthless Adelaide Steamship Company was renamed "Residual Assco Ltd" and was delisted. The worthless David Jones Limited was renamed "DJL". A number of the assets with value were very successfully sold off via public floats, in particular, National Foods, Woolworths, and the department store assets of DJL were floated as "David Jones Limited". In 1995, David Jones announced an $800 million public float of the David Jones and John Martin retail operations. The "new" David Jones Limited was subsequently listed on the Australian Securities Exchange with a new ASX code of DJS. The separation and public float of the department store assets in 1995 resulted in structural and cultural changes, which had periods of stagnancy and high staff turnover. Changes in management had DJs falter in the late 1990s. Shares initially offered at A$2 fell as low as A$0.90.

2000s - present
In 2000, David Jones returned to Western Australia after a near 25 year absence in the state. All 5 stores of the former department store, Aherns, were converted into David Jones stores in Karrinyup, Booragoon, Claremont, Rockingham and the Perth CBD. The Perth CBD Store was the only store of the five that was renovated. Over time, David Jones opened 2 more stores in Western Australia in Mandurah and Cannington, as well as two more stores in Hillarys and Innaloo on hold as of 2021 which would make them the largest department store chain in Western Australia.

In 2003, after a 20 million dollar loss, a strategic review in the company led to the closure of David Jones Rockingham, and the exit of the lease of David Jones Fountain Gate, as well as the closure of the loss-making David Jones Online web-based business and its gourmet food retail stores, Foodchain. It revitalised many of its stores, including its flagship Elizabeth Street and Market Street stores in Sydney (two individual buildings, linked both underground and via air bridge through Westfield Sydney). During this period, sales growth and profit growth were not increasing despite a consumer spending boom and the securing of exclusive deals with Australian and international brands. In this period, the share price was volatile; it reached a high over $4.50. The global downturn in 2009 affected David Jones, reporting a sales decline of 6.4% to $1,061.2m in the first half of 2009.

In June 2010, CEO Mark McInnes resigned after allegations that he had sexually harassed a female employee. McInnes' successor, Paul Zahra, led the company through significant restructuring, including the expansion of the online retail presence until October 2013, when he announced his intention to resign. Zahra retained his position, however, on account of strong shareholder support against Board Chairman Peter Mason, who eventually resigned along with two other directors who had been accused of insider trading.

In 2022, David Jones' parent company Woolworths Holdings Limited entered an agreement to pass ownership over Anchorage Capital Partners, a private equity firm that owns Burger King, Dick Smith, and Golden Circle.

Proposed Myer merger
In October 2013, Myer approached David Jones with a conditional, nonbinding, indicative proposal for a potential merger of the two companies. Myer believed the combined group would have generated pro forma sales and earnings before interest and taxes in 2013 around $5.0 billion and $364 million, respectively. In addition, Myer expected that a merger could have achieved more than $85 million of ongoing annual cost synergies within three years, primarily driven by structural efficiencies. The board of David Jones rejected the offer in November 2013. 
In February 2014, Myer again approached David Jones offering to buy the company at market value, with David Jones having a market capitalisation of $1.7 billion. Myer also indicated that its reappointed chief executive Bernie Brookes would be capable of managing the combined entity should the merger occur. David Jones acknowledged the letter stating it would consider any proposal that is in the best interest of its shareholders but made no further comment.

Takeover by Woolworths South Africa
In April 2014, Myer withdrew its proposed merger of equals following on from David Jones' announcement that it had recommended a $4.00 cash per share proposal and entered into a scheme implementation deed with South African retail group Woolworths, implying a market capitalisation of $2.15 billion. The takeover bid was approved in July 2014 by the Federal Court of Australia. In mid-August 2014, despite the previously stated intention by Woolworths to retain CEO Paul Zahra, Zahra announced his resignation once more amid indications of significant differences between strategy and the future of the company, giving three months' notice to ensure a smooth handover. Woolworths then announced that Country Road CEO Iain Nairn would succeed Zahra as chief executive.

Woolworths South Africa sold the 1938 Market Street store in 2016, with the plan that DJ's would lease and occupy the site until late 2019. The plan was that this would result in the closure of the store, with the nine floors of homewares, furniture, electricals, and menswear being merged into the 1927 flagship Elizabeth Street store, which was to be renovated and have its floors devoted to shopping space expanded from eight to 12.

Entry into New Zealand
In July 2015, the Wellington, New Zealand department store Kirkcaldie & Stains agreed to be purchased by Woolworths (South Africa). The existing Wellington store closed in 2016. It reopened on 28 July 2016 as the first David Jones' store in New Zealand. The store fit-out has cost about $AU20 million, more than originally budgeted. The David Jones website does not provide delivery to New Zealand, remaining a solely Australian trading website.

Management

Executive chairmen
David Jones, 1838–1868
Edward Lloyd Jones, 1868–1894
Edward Lloyd Jones, Jr., 1894–1921
Sir Charles Lloyd Jones, 1921–1958
David Lloyd Jones, 1959–1961
Charles Lloyd Jones, Jr., 1961–1980

Nonexecutive chairmen
Dick Warburton, 1995–2003
Bob Savage, 2003–2013
Peter Mason, 2013–2014
Gordon Cairns, 2014–2016
Ian Moir, 2016–date

Chief executive officers
John Spalvins, 1980–1991
Rod Mewing, 1991–1994
Chris Tideman, 1994–1997
Peter Wilkinson, 1997–2002
Mark McInnes, 2002–2010
Paul Zahra, 2010–2014
Iain Nairn, 2014–2015
John Dixon, 2015–2017
David Thomas, 2017–2019
Ian Moir, 2019 - 2020
Scott Fyfe, 2020 -

Branding

David Jones' branding—a black-on-white houndstooth pattern—is one of the most recognised corporate identities in Australia. A government-sponsored panel judged it in 2006 as one of Australia's top-10 favourite trademarks. The iconic design was the result of a 1967 rebranding exercise by Charles Lloyd Jones, Jr., who desired that the store would be so well known by the design as to not require the use of the name on the packing. It was inspired allegedly from the houndstooth design on a Miss Dior perfume bottle of his mother's, Hannah Jones. 
On 25 July 2016, David Jones' introduced a new logo, with a revised font style and removed references to the houndstooth online.

Slogans have been used for some time at David Jones'. Often, the slogans have been used for multiple decades and have become the definition of the David Jones' offer for a generation. Past slogans include "For Service" (1960s), "There's no other store like David Jones" (1980s and 1990s), "The most beautiful store in the world" (1980s), "Was. Is. Always" (2010s), "'Live an extraordinary life" (2014–2016), and "One name: endless possibilities" (2016–present).

David Jones has for some decades used models and "personalities" as a way of creating cut through in advertising. In the late 20th century, it was Maureen Duval, who also hosted Good Morning Sydney part sponsored by David Jones on TEN-10 Sydney. In the current century, the new models used include Megan Gale, Miranda Kerr, and Jessica Gomes. Kerr worked for the retailer from 2008 until 2013. On 23 March 2013, model Jessica Gomes was announced as Kerr's replacement. Celebrities used by David Jones in recent times include Liz Hurley and Kim Cattrall.

Five stores have food halls, which are viewed as a key part of the David Jones brand, emphasising quality and style, yet have come under recent criticism. The failed Foodchain experiment—effectively a smaller chain of standalone food halls—was sold to the parent company of Freedom Furniture in 2003 after it proved unprofitable. It was announced in July 2016, Neil Perry, a foodservice and restaurant operator, will consult to David Jones' on the new Food Halls, including assortment, presentation, and service.

Stores

David Jones has department stores in all Australian capital cities except Hobart and Darwin. It also has stores in Kotara, Tuggerah, Maitland, Wollongong, Maroochydore, Robina and Broadbeach Waters.

Stores are located in city centre retail areas and enclosed shopping centres. In 2007, David Jones recast its criteria for store locations, reflecting CEO Mark McInnes' intention to concentrate on "low-risk, high-value locations". Stores in Sydney at Bankstown Central (closed July 2007) and Westfield Eastgardens (October 2007) were replaced by Myer, but David Jones replaced the Myer store in Westfield Burwood in May 2007 and opened a new store at Westfield Chermside in August 2007 and a new store at QueensPlaza, Brisbane in February 2008. The Melbourne Bourke Street stores were completely renovated in mid-2010 at a cost of $250 million.

In January 2008, David Jones announced that the Claremont store would be closed in 2009 to allow for a complete rebuilding to reopen in 2011. The new store increased floor space by 60%. David Jones' opened a new format, fashion focused format in Malvern, Victoria on 12 September 2013. On 1 May 2014, David Jones opened in Indooroopilly Shopping Centre, Brisbane. In October 2014, David Jones opened in Macquarie Centre, at the same time a number of foreign retailers opened in the centre including H&M, Zara, and Uniqlo.

In March 2016, the new owners of David Jones', Woolworths South Africa, announced the sale of the nine-floor Market Street Sydney store, housing the Home, Food, and Menswear departments, which is to be incorporated into a renovated Elizabeth Street store, which will have its shopping floors increased from eight to 12. The Market Street store was opened in 1938. The store closed on 16 March 2020.

In February 2017, David Jones announced a three-store deal at Westfield Shopping centres in Western Australia. The three stores are in Westfield Carousel, Westfield Innaloo and Westfield Whitford City. The first store opened in Westfield Carousel in August 2018. As of May 2020, the other two stores have either been put on hold, or silently cancelled. On 22 March 2018, two new stores opened, one in Stockland Green Hills in East Maitland, NSW, and another in Mandurah, WA, in the Mandurah Forum Shopping Centre.

David Jones currently has 47 stores in Australia.

On 22 January 2020, David Jones announced it would close a single David Jones location in Fortitude Valley, Queensland. The location in Fortitude Valley would be closing in June, 2020, after just three years of being open. This location was two levels and a newer, boutique store. David Jones stated that the store didn’t suit the location, and all staff would be relocated to nearby QueensPlaza, or another store in close proximity. 

In July 2020, David Jones announced the sale of the iconic Melbourne Menswear, Home and Food building at 299 Bourke Street. All departments relocated into the refurbished main building at 310 Bourke Street in July 2022. The Food Hall closed permanently during April 2021 in the COVID-19 pandemic lockdown. A tailored selection of food has been retained and incorporated into the renovated main building on level 5.In 2022 David jones announced its closure of the westfield garden city store in 2023 after 52 years  

In 2021, it was announced that David Jones in Wellington, the first in New Zealand, would close on 12 June 2022. This leaves David Jones at Westfield Newmarket in Auckland the only store in New Zealand.

Gallery

Arms

See also

Department stores around the world

References

Further reading

External links

Department stores of Australia
Retail companies of Australia
Companies formerly listed on the Australian Securities Exchange
Retail companies established in 1838
1838 establishments in Australia
Companies based in Sydney
Companies based in Melbourne
Australian subsidiaries of foreign companies
New Zealand companies established in 2016
Australian companies established in 1838
Department stores of New Zealand
Clothing retailers of Australia
Toy retailers of Australia